Polydore is a given name, a form of Polydorus. It may refer to:

Given name:
Polydore Beaufaux (1829–1905), Belgian painter
Polydore Beaulac (1893–1981), politician in the Quebec, Canada
Count Maeterlinck Maurice Polydore Marie Bernard (1862–1949), Belgian playwright, poet, and essayist
Polydore de Keyser (1832–1898), lawyer and Roman Catholic Lord Mayor of London
Moïse Polydore Millaud (1813–1871), journalist, banker and entrepreneur who founded Le Petit Journal
Charles Polydore de Mont (1857–1931), Belgian writer and poet
Frederick Polydore Nodder (1770–1800), English flora and fauna illustrator, copperplate engraver, miniature painter
Polydore Plasden, one of the Catholic Forty Martyrs of England and Wales (died 1591)
Jean Louis Florent Polydore Roux (1792–1833), French painter and naturalist
Polydore Veirman (1881–1951), Belgian rower who won two Olympic silver medals
Polydore Vergil (1470–1555), Italian humanist scholar, historian, priest and diplomat, who spent most of his life in England

Music:
Polydore (Polydorus), opera by the French-Italian composer Jean-Baptiste Stuck

See also
Polydora (disambiguation)